Veale may refer to:

 Bob Veale (born 1935), American baseball player
 Charles Veale (1838–1872), American Civil War Medal of Honor recipient
 Douglas Veale (1891–1973), Registrar of the University of Oxford 1930–1958
 John Veale (1922–2006), English classical composer
 Marty Veale (born 1977), New Zealand-born rugby union player and coach
 Neville Veale, Australian racing cyclist active in the 1960s
 Ron Veale (born 1945), Canadian jurist and former politician
 Theodore William Henry Veale (1892–1980), English recipient of the Victoria Cross
 William Charles Douglas Veale (1895–1971), Town Clerk (CEO) of the City of Adelaide (1947–1965)

See also

 Veale Gardens in Adelaide, named after William Charles Douglas Veale
 Veale Township, Daviess County, Indiana